Bangladesh Women Chamber of Commerce and Industry or BWCCI, is an industry trade body of women entrepreneurs. Selima Ahmad is the founding President of the Bangladesh Women Chamber of Commerce and Industry.

History
Bangladesh Women Chamber of Commerce and Industry was established in 2001 by Selima Ahmad. It was the first women's chamber in Bangladesh. It conducts research on women entrepreneurs in Bangladesh. In 2016, the chamber sought funding of 250 million taka to establish training center for women entrepreneurs.

References

2001 establishments in Bangladesh
Organisations based in Dhaka
Chambers of commerce in Bangladesh
Research institutes in Bangladesh